Barnstable is a town in the U.S. state of Massachusetts and the county seat of Barnstable County. Barnstable is the largest community, both in land area and population, on Cape Cod, and is one of thirteen Massachusetts municipalities that have been granted city forms of government by the Commonwealth of Massachusetts but wish to retain "the town of" in their official names. At the 2020 census it had a population of 48,916. The town contains several villages (one of which is also named Barnstable) within its boundaries. Its largest village, Hyannis, is the central business district of the county and home to Barnstable Municipal Airport, the airline hub of Cape Cod and the islands of Martha's Vineyard and Nantucket. Additionally, Barnstable is a 2007 winner of the All-America City Award.

History

Barnstable takes its name from the English town of Barnstaple, in the county of Devon. The first European to explore the area was Bartholomew Gosnold in 1602. It was settled in 1638, as one of the first towns in the Plymouth Colony, one year behind Sandwich further south in Massachusetts on Cape Cod.  It was incorporated on September 4, 1639, the same day as the towns of Sandwich,  and Yarmouth. On the first Tuesday of December, the same year, its deputies took their seats in the general court. The early settlers were farmers, led by the Reverend Joseph Hull, the founder of Barnstable. A memorial tablet was dedicated there in 1939 (the 300th anniversary of the town's founding) marking the site of his home, and the rock from which he preached still stands along the highway there.

Soon after the town's founding, agriculture, fishing and salt works became its major industries. By the end of the 19th century, there were some 804 ships harbored in the town. But the role of sailing ships declined with the rise of ocean-going steamships and the railroad, which had arrived in 1854.

By the late 19th century, Barnstable was becoming world-renowned as the tourist destination it still is to this day. Many prominent Bostonians spent their summers on the Cape shores, as did presidents Ulysses S. Grant and Grover Cleveland. The most well-known family of the 20th century to summer in the town was, and remains, the Kennedy family. They still inhabit the Kennedy Compound in Hyannis Port. This was the summer home of President John F. Kennedy during his administration, and it was likewise the home of Senator Ted Kennedy until his death.

Today, tourists come in droves to the town during the summer months. Hyannis has numerous shops. Other attractions include the John F. Kennedy Museum and several other museums. Significant sites and renowned historic houses listed on the National Register of Historic Places include the Ancient Burying Ground and Gideon Hawley House, representing the town's colonial history. The town's many beaches are popular tourist destinations as well.

Geography

Barnstable is located at  (41.659158, –70.353059), about halfway along the "biceps" of the Cape Cod "arm". It is bordered by Cape Cod Bay on the north, Nantucket Sound on the south, Sandwich and Mashpee on the west and Yarmouth on the east.

Villages

The Town of Barnstable contains several villages, which are not legally defined entities.  Between seven and eleven are commonly enumerated, listed below with ZIP codes:
 The village of Barnstable (02630), including Cummaquid (02637)
 Centerville (02632)
 Cotuit (02635)
 Hyannis (02601), including Hyannis Port (02647) and West Hyannisport (02672)
 Marstons Mills (02648)
 Osterville (02655)
 West Barnstable (02668)

To the north of Barnstable lie the dunes of Sandy Neck along Barnstable Harbor, tipped by the Sandy Neck Light. The central part of the town is dominated by the pines and oaks around Wequaquet Lake. The south is where the bulk of the population lives, many along the beaches of Centerville and Hyannis Harbors. Hyannis is the biggest village in Barnstable by size and population.

Climate

According to the Köppen climate classification system, Barnstable has a humid continental climate (Dfb). Dfb climates are characterized by at least one month having an average mean temperature ≤ 32.0 °F (≤ 0.0 °C), at least four months with an average mean temperature ≥ 50.0 °F (≥ 10.0 °C), all months with an average mean temperature ≤ 71.6 °F (≤ 22.0 °C), and no significant precipitation difference between seasons. The average seasonal (Nov-Apr) snowfall total is around 30 in (76 cm). The average snowiest month is February which corresponds with the annual peak in nor'easter activity. According to the United States Department of Agriculture, the plant hardiness zone is 7a with an average annual extreme minimum air temperature of 0.3 °F (-17.6 °C).

Ecology

According to the A. W. Kuchler U.S. Potential natural vegetation Types, Barnstable, Massachusetts would primarily contain a Northeastern Oak/Pine (110) vegetation type with a Southern Mixed Forest (26) vegetation form.

Demographics

As of the census of 2000, there were 47,821 people, 19,626 households, and 13,012 families residing in the town. The racial makeup of the town was 91.85% White, 2.74% Black or African American, 0.59% Native American, 0.81% Asian, 0.04% Pacific Islander, 1.67% from other races, and 2.30% from two or more races. Hispanic or Latino of any race were 1.70% of the population. 24.2% were of Irish, 13.3% English, 9.3% Italian and 5.5% American ancestry according to Census 2000. 92.1% spoke English, 3.4% Portuguese, 1.6% Spanish and 1.0% French as their first language.

There were 19,626 households, out of which 26.9% had children under the age of 18 living with them, 52.4% were married couples living together, 10.7% had a female householder with no husband present, and 33.7% were non-families. 27.7% of all households were made up of individuals, and 12.5% had someone living alone who was 65 years of age or older. The average household size was 2.38 and the average family size was 2.88.

In the town the population was spread out, with 22.0% under the age of 18, 5.6% from 18 to 24, 26.8% from 25 to 44, 25.5% from 45 to 64, and 20.1% who were 65 years of age or older. The median age was 42 years. For every 100 females, there were 91.6 males. For every 100 females age 18 and over, there were 87.9 males.

The median income for a household in the town was $46,811, and the median income for a family was $54,026. Males had a median income of $41,494 versus $30,442 for females. The per capita income for the town was $25,554. About 6.3% of families and 8.8% of the population were below the poverty line, including 11.7% of those under age 18 and 5.9% of those age 65 or over.

Government

Barnstable has a council–manager government. It was created in 1989, when the Town rewrote its charter and changed from a selectmen-town meeting form of government to adopt a council-manager system. The council hires the town manager. Barnstable is one of thirteen Massachusetts municipalities that have applied for, and been granted, city forms of government but wish to retain "the town of" in their official names.

The first town manager, Warren Rutherford, held office from 1990 to 1997. His successor, James Tinsley, served from 1997 to 1999. He was succeeded by former state representative John C. Klimm. Klimm had his contract bought out in 2011 due to internal disputes among a majority of the Barnstable City Council. He was succeeded by the executive director of the Barnstable Housing Authority, Thomas K. Lynch. Mark Ells has served as the Town Manager since 2016.

The town hall is located in the village of Hyannis, and the police station is located on Route 132, closer to the geographic center of the town. There are eight fire stations, seven libraries, and ten post offices located throughout the town. The largest, or central branches, are usually located in the downtown Hyannis area. Hyannis also is the site of the Cape Cod Hospital, which serves the central Cape region. As the county seat of Barnstable County, the town is the site of the county courthouse and juvenile lockup at the old House of Corrections, as well as the Offices of the Cape and Islands District Attorney.

Barnstable is represented in the Massachusetts House of Representatives as a part of the Second, Third and Fifth Barnstable districts. The town is represented in the Massachusetts Senate as a part of the Cape and Islands district,  which encompasses most of Cape Cod, Martha's Vineyard and Nantucket. The town is patrolled by the Second (Yarmouth) Barracks of Troop D of the Massachusetts State Police.

On the national level, Barnstable is a part of Massachusetts's 9th congressional district, and is currently represented by William R. Keating. The state's senior (Class II) member of the United States Senate, is Elizabeth Warren. The junior senator from Massachusetts is Ed Markey, elected in 2013.

Education

Barnstable has the largest public school enrollment of any town on Cape Cod, with over 5,000 students. In 2010, the public school system underwent major changes due to budgetary constraints. The presently operational schools include: the Enoch Cobb Early Learning Center for pre-school students and five elementary schools serving various grades, including: Centerville Elementary School (K–3), Barnstable Community Horace Mann Public Charter School (formerly Hyannis East Elementary School) (K–3), West Villages Elementary School (formerly Marstons Mills East Elementary School) (K–3), Hyannis West Elementary School (K–3), and Barnstable-West Barnstable Elementary School (K–3). The Barnstable United Elementary School (formerly Barnstable Horace Mann Charter School) serves the Town's fourth and fifth grade students. The Barnstable Intermediate School (formerly Barnstable Middle School) serves grades six and seven. Barnstable High School serves grades eight through twelve. Barnstable's athletic teams are nicknamed the Red Hawks, and their colors are red and white. Their teams are highly successful because of the large student body from which to choose players. Notable town rivals of the Red Hawks are Dennis/Yarmouth and Falmouth. Barnstable has played Falmouth in football on Thanksgiving Day nearly every year since 1895, making the annual game one of the longest-standing high school football rivalries in history.

In addition to its public schools, there are also several private schools in Barnstable. There are five Christian schools, three of which are not Catholic: Bayberry Christian Academy (K–3), Faith Christian School (Pre-K–12), and Trinity Christian Academy (Pre-K–12). There are two Catholic schools, Saint Francis Xavier Prep (5–8) and Pope John Paul II High School, which opened in 2007. Barnstable is also home to the Academy of Early Learning (Pre-K–6), Veritas Academy (K–8), and the Cape Cod Academy, a private K–12 school. There are also two special education schools (Southeast Alternative & Beacon Point), as well as the Sturgis Charter School, which serves high school-aged students. Additionally, high school students have the option of attending Cape Cod Regional Technical High School in Harwich free of charge.

Barnstable is the home of Cape Cod Community College, a two-year junior college affiliated with Suffolk University in Boston.

Transportation
Both U.S. Route 6 and Massachusetts Route 28 pass through the town from west to east, with Route 6 being a four-lane freeway through the town. Routes 6A, 132, 149 and a brief, 1/10 mile portion of 130 are also located in town. Route 6A follows an east–west route to the north of Route 6, on its route between the Sagamore Bridge and the Orleans Rotary. Routes 132 and 149 are both entirely located within the town, and both begin at 6A and end at Route 28.

Since 2013, the CapeFlyer passenger rail service has run on weekends between Memorial Day and Columbus Day. The Kingston/Route 3 and Middleborough/Lakeville stations of the MBTA's commuter rail system provide the closest, year-round, direct service to Boston. The nearest inter-city (Amtrak) passenger rail stations are Boston's South Station and Providence. Freight rail service is provided by the Massachusetts Coastal Railroad.

The Cape Cod Central Railroad operates seasonal tourist excursions from Hyannis to Sandwich and Sagamore, with some scheduled weekend stops at the West Barnstable depot on Route 149 near Route 6A.

The town is the site of two airports. Cape Cod Airfield is a smaller airfield, used primarily for private travel, and Barnstable Municipal Airport at Polando Field is used for regional flights, especially between the Cape and the islands. Regional airline Cape Air is headquartered in Barnstable. The nearest national and international air service can be reached at Logan International Airport in Boston. Hyannis is also the site of the main ferry lines to Nantucket and Martha's Vineyard.

Notable people

 Demetrius Atsalis, state representative
 Orrin Bacon, Wisconsin state legislator
 Austin Bearse, abolitionist, merchant mariner 
 Gary Brito, LTG U.S. Army
 Joe Cronin, professional baseball player, manager, and Hall of Famer
 Gary DiSarcina, MLB player and coach
 Isaac Dunbar, singer-songwriter
 Raymond Goulding, comedian, actor, writer
 Andy Hallett, actor and singer
 Tom Hamilton, bassist for the rock band Aerosmith
 John Havlicek, basketball player for the Boston Celtics
 Thomas Hinckley, governor of Plymouth Colony
 Rev. Joseph Hull, minister who moved to Massachusetts and founded the Hull Colony 
 Amy Jo Johnson, original Pink Power Ranger
 Herbert Kalmus, co-founder and president of the Technicolor Corporation
 Edward M. Kennedy, U.S. senator from Massachusetts, 1962–2009
 John F. Kennedy, 35th President of the United States
 Joseph P. Kennedy Sr., 44th United States Ambassador to the United Kingdom, 1938–1940
 Joseph P. Kennedy II, served in the U.S. House of Representatives from Massachusetts
 Patrick J. Kennedy, Rhode Island congressman and youngest child of Ted Kennedy
 Robert F. Kennedy, United States Attorney General, 1961–1964, and U.S. senator from New York, 1965–1968
 Rose Fitzgerald Kennedy, matriarch of the Kennedy family
 Jack Kerouac, novelist, poet, artist
 Paul G. Kirk, U.S. senator from Massachusetts, 2009–2010
 Dan LaCouture, NHL hockey wingman
 Reverend John Lothropp, founder of Town of Barnstable
 Siobhan Magnus, former American Idol contestant
 Neal McDonough, film and television actor
 Eric Nickulas, NHL hockey player for the Boston Bruins
 John T. Olson, brigadier general in the United States Air Force
 James Otis, lawyer and American patriot
 Larry Page, co-founder of Google
 Paul Pena, blues singer, guitarist
 John Percival, captain of the USS Constitution
 Jane Maria Read (born 1853), poet, artist, teacher
 Robert Richardson, Academy Award-winning cinematographer
 Marnie Schulenburg, actor
 Lemuel Shaw, state representative, state senator, 1821–1822; Massachusetts Chief Justice, 1830–1860
 Casey Sherman, bestselling author of A Rose for Mary, Black Irish & The Finest Hours
 Eunice Kennedy Shriver, founder of the Special Olympics
 Robert Sargent Shriver Jr., 21st United States Ambassador to France, founder of the Peace Corps
 William F. Sturgis, a Boston merchant and politician in 1800s
 Paul Stewart, professional ice hockey player and NHL referee
 Michael Tonello, bestselling author
 Kathleen Kennedy Townsend, lieutenant governor of Maryland, 1995–2003
 Kurt Vonnegut, author, political icon, entertainer
 Mercy Otis Warren, author, poet, playwright, and American patriot
 Eden White, singer
 Max Willman, hockey player for the Philadelphia Flyers

See also
 Barnstaple, England (often called the town's twin)
 National Register of Historic Places listings in Barnstable County, Massachusetts

References

External links

 
 
 Town of Barnstable official website

 
1637 establishments in Massachusetts
Cities in Barnstable County, Massachusetts
County seats in Massachusetts
Populated coastal places in Massachusetts
Populated places established in 1637